Chiragpally is a village in Medak district in Telangana.

Villages in Medak district